The Singapore Customs is a government agency under the Ministry of Finance of the Government of Singapore. Singapore Customs was reconstituted on 1 April 2003, 
after the Customs and Excise Department and the Trade Facilitation Division and Statistics Audit Unit of International Enterprise Singapore (IE Singapore) were merged.
The border function's at the land, air and sea checkpoints were also simultaneously transferred to Immigration and Checkpoints Authority (ICA). Singapore Customs became the lead agency on trade facilitation and revenue enforcement matters. It is also responsible for the implementation of customs and trade enforcement measures including those related to Free Trade Agreements and strategic goods.

The headquarters is located in Revenue House along Newton Road, Novena.

Goods and Services Tax (GST) Refund for Tourists
The Customs of Singapore is assisting on behalf of the Inland Revenue Authority of Singapore (IRAS) to administer the GST endorsement for the Tourist Refund Scheme (TRS) at Changi Airport Terminals 1-4.

History
The Customs Department was founded when Singapore was the British Empire's Straits Settlements and later Crown Colony. Established in 1910 under the name Government Monopolies Department, Customs is one of the oldest tax-collecting organisations in modern Singapore to increase the country's state coffers to help fund national programmes. Revenue collection began in December 1909 when the first import duty was imposed on hard liquors. In 1916, the tariff was extended to include tobacco and cigarettes. The collection of duty on petroleum was introduced in 1934. Motor vehicles are also subject to tax and excise duties. Effective 1 January 2012, compressed natural gas (CNG) for motor vehicles is subject to tax and excise duty.

The department has gone through many transitions, mergers, and re-organizations in the last century under the government of Singapore. The department's responsibilities in securing Singapore's future are affected by worldwide globalization, market forces and changes in laws, tariffs, trading and traveling trends.

On 1 April 2003, the department was re-constituted as Singapore Customs - a government agency transferred to the Ministry of Finance of Singapore - providing essential services for revenue collection and enforcement, trade documentation, trade facilitation, and security functions as Singapore’s single authority on customs and trade regulatory matters.

On 15 November 2019, the new Customs Operations Command building was officially opened at Bulim Drive off Jalan Bahar in Jurong West. This will allow for intelligence, investigation and compliance-related functions to come under the command.

Primary roles and functions
Singapore Customs' primary roles and functions are:
collection of customs revenue;
protection of customs revenue by preventing the evasion of duties and taxes;
provision of one-stop service for trade and customs matters, such as issuance of permits, licenses and Certificates of Origin, and provision of classification and valuation advice;
facilitation of trade through simplification of customs procedures and administration of tax break schemes;
enforcement of trade requirements under the respective Free Trade Agreements (FTAs);
regulation of trade in strategic goods and strategic goods technology; and
enforcement against the illegal buying and selling of all kinds of duty-unpaid tobacco and liquors.

Organisational structure
Singapore Customs is currently headed by a Director-General, who is assisted by a Deputy Director-General, 3 Senior Assistant Directors-General, 4 Assistant Directors-General, a Chief Human Resource Officer, and a Chief Information Technology Officer.

The work of Singapore Customs is performed by the Trade Division, Compliance Division, Human Resource Directorate, Policy & Planning Division, Checkpoints Division, Intelligence & Investigation Division, Ops-Tech & Management Division, and the Information Technology Directorate.

Each branch in a division is typically headed by a Chief Superintendent of Customs or a non-uniform equivalent.

The Internal Audit Branch reports directly to the Director-General of Customs.

Rank structure
The rank structure of Singapore Customs is as such, in order of descending seniority:

See also
 Immigration and Checkpoints Authority
 Inland Revenue Authority of Singapore
 Ministry of Finance (Singapore)

References

External links
 Singapore Customs Official Website
 Secure Trade Partnership
 Strategic Trade Scheme
 National Authority (Chemical Weapons Convention)
 TradeNet

2003 establishments in Singapore
Customs services
Finance in Singapore
Government agencies established in 2003
Organisations of the Singapore Government
Law enforcement agencies of Singapore